The baju lamina (also known as lamena by Bugis, sa 'dan by Toraja, lamina or laminah by Malays) is a mail and plate armor from the Nusantara archipelago (Indonesia, Malaysia, Brunei, and Philippines).

Description
The baju lamina is a chain armor that is worked in the form of a vest. The back portion consist of small rectangular brass plates, the front of brass rings. Several rectangular brass plates are attached to the brass rings, which extend from the height of the collarbone to about the lower edge of the last costal arch. The brass plates serve to reinforce the chain armor at the level of the more vulnerable chest and pelvis. The baju lamina has neither sleeves nor a collar. One of the earliest references to this armor is after the conquest of Malacca by Portuguese (1511). The son of Afonso de Albuquerque mentioned the armament of Malacca:

Around the 17th century, the Bugis people started using mail and plate armors and they were still used until the 19th century.

Gallery

See also 

 Baju rantai
 Baju empurau
 Baru Öröba
 Baru Lema'a
 Chain mail
 Karambalangan
 Kawaca
 Siping-siping

References

Further reading
 Russell Jones (Hrsg.): Loan-words in Indonesian and Malay. KITLV-Jakarta – Yayasan Obor Indonesia, Jakarta 2008, .

External links
 Baju Lamina in Pitt Rivers Museum

Indonesian inventions
Asian armour
Body armor
Military equipment of antiquity
Military equipment of Indonesia